James Vincent Pryor (born 1968) is an American philosopher and Professor of Philosophy at the University of North Carolina at Chapel Hill (UNC). He is known for his expertise on epistemology and philosophy of language. Before teaching at UNC, Pryor was a faculty member in the philosophy department of New York University. He has also taught at Harvard University and Princeton University.

References

External links
Personal Website
James Pryor, Google Scholar

21st-century American philosophers
Philosophers of language
Philosophy academics
Living people
1968 births
Princeton University alumni
Cornell University alumni
New York University faculty
Princeton University faculty
Harvard University faculty
Epistemologists
Analytic philosophers